On the Heights of Despair is a Romanian philosophical work written by Emil Cioran, published in 1934 as his first book.  It consists of several brief reflections on negative themes which later permeated Cioran's work, such as death, insomnia and insanity.  

It was one of several works that Cioran wrote in his native Romanian language.  In 1937, Cioran left Romania and relocated to Paris, where he lived for the rest of his life.  This break marked two definite periods in Cioran's life and work: an early Romanian period, and a later, mature French period.  Cioran later published several works in French, which brought him to wider attention.

On the Heights of Despair received a young authors' prize, established by the King Carol II Foundation for Art and Literature.  Cioran's later works received other awards, including the Prix Rogier Namier and the Grand prix de littérature Paul-Morand, although Cioran declined both.  In 1992, On the Heights of Despair was translated into English by Ilinca Zarifopol-Johnston.

Synopsis

The text consists of 66 brief titled sections, usually ranging in length from one to three pages.  In each section, Cioran considers certain emotions or psychological states, contrasting them with each other.  He focuses on negative emotions, such as sadness, melancholy, and agony.  For Cioran, while sadness itself is an acute emotion which may follow moments of happiness, melancholy is a more diffuse form of sadness, associated with regret and ambiguity.  

Cioran praises lyricism and heightened emotional states for their ability to force humans to reconsider the truly important categories of the human condition, such as love and death.  Humans may ignore such categories for several years by focusing on the routines of everyday life, or by participating in rational or intellectual endeavors.  Cioran scorns the latter categories:

Throughout the text, Cioran also expresses anti-rationalist and anti-Christian views:

Although Cioran focuses on negative emotions and gives contrarian opinions, he also considers certain positive emotions and expresses more conventional views rejecting certain negative states, although these rejections have an anti-Christian content.  Innocence and grace are described as positive states, although Cioran's grace is more secular and aesthetic, as opposed to the religious sense of the English word.  Although he praises the heightened emotions which suffering can induce, Cioran explicitly rejects poverty and suffering themselves as purely destructive states which have none of the nobility or catharsis which Christianity confers upon them.

Background

On the Heights of Despair was written in a bout of depression and insomnia, conditions from which Cioran suffered throughout his life: "I've never been able to write otherwise than in the midst of the depression brought about by my nights of insomnia. For seven years I could barely sleep. I need this depression, and even today before I sit down to write I play a disk of Gypsy music from Hungary."  The book's title derives from a phrase that was commonly used in Romanian newspapers of the period to begin the obituaries of suicides, e.g. "On the heights of despair, young so-and-so took his life...".

At the time of writing On the Heights of Despair, Cioran was sympathetic to National Socialism.  He expressed support for the Night of the Long Knives, which occurred in the same year that the book was published. Despite this, On the Heights of Despair expresses attitudes which are contrary to National Socialist philosophy.

The cover of the book's English edition is a detail of the Temptation of Saint Anthony, as painted on the Isenheim Altarpiece by Matthias Grünewald.  The image depicts monstrous demons who are attacking the saint.

Reception

On the Heights of Despair was noted for its elaborate prose, aphorisms and philosophical pessimism, expressed in a style that Cioran would later be recognised for.  Speaking on Cioran in general terms, Saint-John Perse described him as "the greatest French writer to honour our language since the death of Paul Valéry."

Although Cioran gained a following among French intellectuals during his later years, the response to his early work in his home country of Romania was overwhelmingly negative.  Cioran's father was a priest, and his mother was head of a local Christian Women's League.  The blasphemous nature of Cioran's work forced his parents to maintain a low profile. His mother once said that if she had known how miserable he would become, she would have aborted him, a statement which Cioran described as "liberating". Despite this, she still read his works, whereas his father refused, because of his profession: "Everything that I wrote bothered him and he didn't know how to react. But my mother understood me." Cioran's works were banned under the rule of Nicolae Ceaușescu.

See also
The Trouble with Being Born
Peter Wessel Zapffe
The Conspiracy Against the Human Race

References

Source text

Citations

1934 books
Philosophy books
Romanian books
Works about antinatalism
Works about philosophical pessimism
Works by Emil Cioran